Red Deer is a city in Alberta, Canada, located midway on the Calgary–Edmonton Corridor. Red Deer serves central Alberta, and key industries include health care, retail trade, construction, oil and gas, hospitality, manufacturing and education. It is surrounded by Red Deer County and borders on Lacombe County. The city is located in aspen parkland, a region of rolling hills, alongside the Red Deer River.

History 
The area was inhabited by First Nations including the Blackfoot, Plains Cree and Stoney before the arrival of European fur traders in the late eighteenth century. A First Nations trail ran from the Montana Territory across the Bow River near present-day Calgary and on to Fort Edmonton, later known as the Calgary and Edmonton Trail. The trail crossed the Red Deer River at a wide, stony shallows.

Cree people called the river , which means "Elk River." European arrivals sometimes called North American elk "red deer," after the related Eurasian species, and later named the community after the river. The name for the modern city in Plains Cree is a calque of the English name (literally "red type of deer"), while the name of the river itself is still  or "elk river."

First Nations on the north side of the river entered into Treaty 6 in 1876 and on the south side Treaty 7 in 1877. Farmers and ranchers began to settle on the fertile lands.

A trading post and stopping house were built at the Crossing in 1882. This became Fort Normandeau during the 1885 North-West Rebellion.

Leonard Gaetz
One early settler Leonard Gaetz gave a half-share of  he had acquired to the Calgary and Edmonton Railway to develop a bridge over the river and a townsite. As a result, the Crossing was gradually abandoned and the first trains arrived in 1891.

Gaetz founded the Westerner showgrounds and annual "Westerner Days," akin to the Calgary Stampede.

1900 to 1929
Following World War I, Red Deer emerged as a small, quiet, but prosperous, prairie city.

Bird watcher and citizen scientist Elsie Cassels helped to establish the Gaetz Lakes bird sanctuary.

1930 to 1945
During Great Depression of the 1930s, Central Alberta was not hit by severe drought. The city was virtually debt-free and profited from its ownership of the local public utilities.

In World War II, a large army training camp was located where Cormack Armoury, the Memorial Centre and Lindsay Thurber High School are now. Two training airfields were built south of the city at Penhold and Bowden.

Post–Second World War
Red Deer expanded rapidly following the major discovery of hydrocarbons in Alberta in the late 1940s. Red Deer became a centre for oil and gas and related industries, such as the Joffre Cogeneration Plant.

Government and administrative services include a hospital, a courthouse and a provincial building.

The railway moved to the outskirts and passenger train service ceased. The CPR bridge is now a walking trail.

Red Deer was Alberta's third largest city between 1981 and 2019, when Lethbridge breifly regained it.
Red Deer has since regained 3rd place.

Geography

Climate 
Red Deer has a humid continental climate (Köppen Dfb), with something of a semi-arid influence due to city's location within Palliser's Triangle. The city lies in the 4a plant hardiness zone. Summers are typically warm and rainy with cool nights. Winters are typically long, cold, and very dry.

Neighbourhoods 
Red Deer includes the following neighbourhoods:

Anders Park
Anders Park East
Anders South
Aspen Ridge
Bower
Bower Ponds Recreation Area
Central Park
Chiles Industrial Park
Clearview Extension
Clearview Meadows
Clearview Ridge
College Park
Davenport
Deer Park Estates
Deer Park Village
Devonshire
Downtown
East Burnt Lake
Eastview
Eastview Estates
Edgar Industrial Park
Evergreen
Fairview
Gaetz Lakes Sanctuary
Garden Heights
Glendale
Glendale Park Estates
Golden West
Grandview
Heritage Ranch
Highland Green
Highland Green Estates
Inglewood
Ironstone
Johnstone Crossing
Johnstone Park
Kentwood East
Kentwood West
Kingsgate
Lancaster Green
Lancaster Meadows
Laredo
Lonsdale
Maskepetoon Park
McKenzie Trail Recreation Area
Michener Hill
Morrisroe
Morrisroe Extension
Mountview
Normandeau
Northlands Industrial Park
Oriole Park
Oriole Park West
Parkvale
Pines
Queens Business Park
Red Deer College
Red Deer Golf and Country Club
Riverlands
Riverside Heavy Industrial Park
Riverside Light Industrial Park
Riverside Meadows
Rosedale Estates
Rosedale Meadows
South Hill
Southbrook
Southpointe Junction
Sunnybrook
Sunnybrook Extension
Three Mile Bend Recreation Area
Timber Ridge
Timberlands
Timberstone
Vanier Woods
Vanier Woods East
Waskasoo
Waste Management Facility
West Burnt Lake
West Park
West QE2
Westerner Park
Westlake
Woodlea

Red Deer's corporate limits also includes the localities of College Park, Forth, Labuma, and North Red Deer.

Demographics 

Ethnicity 
According to the 2016 census, 15.2% of the general population identified as visible minority (non-aboriginal), an increase of 55.9% over the previous five years. A separate 7.1% reported North American Aboriginal Origins (4.2% First Nations and 3.1% Métis).

Note: Totals greater than 100% due to multiple origin responses.

Arts and culture 
Red Deer hosts many arts and cultural groups, including: Central Alberta Theatre, Ignition Theatre, Red Deer Players Society, Bull Skit Comedy troupe, Central Music Festival, the Red Deer Symphony Orchestra, the Red Deer Museum + Art Gallery, the Red Deer Royals and other performing arts and fine arts organizations. The Red Deer Arts Council is a member-based Multi-disciplinary Arts Service Organization and registered charity that serves the local and area community of visual, literary and performing artists.

Attractions 

Alberta Sports Hall of Fame
The Alberta Sports Hall of Fame is adjacent to the Queen Elizabeth II Highway (Highway 2) and the Greater Red Deer Visitor Centre.

Canyon Ski Resort

Peavey Mart Centrium
The Centrium hosts sports events, concerts, trade shows and conventions. It is the home of the WHL’s Red Deer Rebels.

G.H. Dawe Community Centre
The  G.H. Dawe Community Centre is shared by G.H. Dawe Community School, the G.H. Dawe Branch of the Red Deer Public Library, G.H. Dawe Centre Recreation Facility and St. Patrick's School.

Greater Red Deer Visitor Centre
The Greater Red Deer Visitor Centre is adjacent to the Queen Elizabeth II Highway (Highway 2) and the Alberta Sports Hall of Fame.

Recreation Centre
The Recreation Centre, located downtown, has indoor and outdoor pools, steam rooms and hot tubs among other features.

Red Deer Museum + Art Gallery
The Red Deer Museum has a permanent exhibit detailing the history of the region, and temporary exhibits that change every few months. It is also the venue of multiple educational programs for both adults and children.

Waskasoo Park
Waskasoo Park meanders through Red Deer from its outskirts in the southwest, through the heart of the city, to its outskirts in the northeast along the Red Deer River. The park is one of the reasons Red Deer is known as "Park City."

Westerner Exposition Grounds
The Westerner Exposition Grounds hosts events such as Agricon and Westerner Days. Held in early July, Westerner Days includes a rodeo, pony chuck-wagon racing, a fair, exhibitions and other events.

Sports 
The Red Deer Rebels of the Western Hockey League play at the Peavey Mart Centrium. Red Deer hosted the 2022 Hlinka Gretzky Cup and co-hosted the 2018 Hlinka Gretzky Cup. Red Deer co-hosted the COVID-interrupted 2022 World Junior Ice Hockey Championships, later completed in Edmonton, and the 1995 World Junior Ice Hockey Championships. In 2018, Red Deer replaced Edmonton as host of the Canadian Finals Rodeo. The Rebels hosted the 2016 Memorial Cup.

Red Deer hosted the 2019 Canada Winter Games, leaving the Gary W. Harris Canada Games Centre at Red Deer Polytechnic and the Downtown Servus Arena as legacy facilities.

The city is the hometown to well-known sporting personalities. Olympic gold medal pairs figure skater Jamie Salé and silver medal swimmer Rebecca Smith are from Red Deer. Olympic silver medalist speed skater Jeremy Wotherspoon also spent most of his childhood in Red Deer after being born in Saskatchewan. Olympic bronze medal aerialist Deidra Dionne grew up in Red Deer. Olympic bronze medal alpine skier Jan Hudec first immigrated to Red Deer for his father to ski coach.  NHL players include Ron Anderson, Blake Wesley, Glen Wesley, Trent Hunter, Chris Mason, Randy Moller, Brandon Sutter, Paul Postma, Kris Russell, Colton Sceviour, Matt Fraser and Mark Tinordi. Hockey Night in Canada personality and Olympic host Ron MacLean calls Red Deer home.

Infrastructure 
Transportation
The Queen Elizabeth II Highway, Alberta's busiest and most economically important, links the North-South Calgary-Edmonton Corridor, including Wetaskiwin and Camrose, with Red Deer.

The David Thompson Highway links Rocky Mountain House in the West Country with Stettler in East-Central Alberta.

Red Deer Regional Airport, in Penhold, serves mostly general aviation. It is undergoing a significant expansion.

Red Deer Transit provides local bus service throughout the city.

Health care
Health care is provided at the Red Deer Regional Hospital.

Water
Red Deer receives its drinking water supply from the Red Deer River which is treated and distributed throughout the city. One distinct feature of the water distribution system is the Horton Water Spheroid which, at the time of its construction in 1957, was the world's largest spheroid shaped reservoir. Water from the Red Deer water treatment plant is distributed to neighbouring communities including Red Deer County, Lacombe, Blackfalds and Ponoka as managed by the North Red Deer Regional Water Services Commission. Wastewater is collected and sent to the City of Red Deer wastewater treatment plant which treats the sewage with a combination of grit traps, a primary clarifier, biological nutrient removal bioreactors, secondary clarifiers, and UV disinfection. Solids generated from the treatment process are treated using dissolved air flotation, anaerobic digestion, and biosolids lagoons. Treated effluent is then discharged back into the Red Deer River downstream of the water treatment plant.

Education

Post-secondary 
Red Deer Polytechnic (RDP), formerly Red Deer College, was founded in 1964 as Red Deer Junior College. RDP offers certificates, diplomas, advanced certificates, applied degrees, bachelor's degrees, academic upgrading and apprenticeship in over 75 different career and academic programs, including the creative and liberal arts, engineering, and trades.

Secondary 
Three school authorities operate in Red Deer.

Founded in 1887, the Red Deer Public School District serves 10,000 students in thirty schools. Offering a wide range of programming, including French Immersion from K-12, the district not only meets the needs of children and youth from the City of Red Deer and welcomes international students from around the world. Lindsay Thurber Comprehensive High School and Hunting Hills High School provide a large number of program options for students of high school age.

Founded in 1909, when the Daughters of Wisdom, a religious order from France, accepted the challenge of the Tinchebray Fathers, also from France, to offer Catholic schooling in Red Deer, Red Deer Catholic Regional Schools (RDCRS) welcomes almost 7,000 students in five Central Alberta communities, including Red Deer. They operate École Secondaire Notre Dame High School and St. Joseph's High School.

Greater North Central Francophone Education Region No. 2's school École La Prairie is a French school located near downtown Red Deer that offers pre-kindergarten through grade 9 programs. It offers all courses in French to a population of 119 students whose first language is French.

Public schools

Catholic schools

Private schools
 Destiny Christian School Society (ECS, K–9)
 Koinonia Christian School – Red Deer (ECS, K–12)
 Parkland School Special Education (1–12)
 South Side Christian School (ECS, K–12)

Media 

You can get the local news from Red Deer Advocate and rdnewsNOW.  Edmonton CTV and Global News also carry Red Deer news.  The City of Red Deer also releases regular updates.

See also 

 List of cities in Alberta
 List of communities in Alberta
 :Category:People from Red Deer, Alberta

Notes

References

Further reading

External links 

 
1894 establishments in the Northwest Territories
Cities in Alberta
Populated places established in 1882